A Shot in the Dark is a 1933 British mystery film directed by George Pearson and starring Dorothy Boyd, O. B. Clarence, Jack Hawkins and Michael Shepley. It was shot at Twickenham Studios in London as a quota quickie for release by RKO Pictures.

Synopsis 
When a wealthy old man dies suddenly, a local priest suspects something and begins to investigate.

Cast
 Dorothy Boyd as Alaris Browne 
 O. B. Clarence as Reverend John Makehan 
 Jack Hawkins as Norman Paull 
 Michael Shepley as Vivien Waugh 
 Davy Burnaby as Colonel Michael Browne 
 A. Bromley Davenport as Peter Browne 
 Russell Thorndike as Doctor Stuart 
 Hugh E. Wright as George Yarrow 
 Henrietta Watson as Angela Browne 
 Margaret Yarde as Kate Browne

Critical reception
Britmovie noted a "typical multi-suspect “quota quickie”"; and Classic Horror online wrote, "we nominate SHOT IN THE DARK as the worst film ever made! But this is not to detract anything from its entertainment value. Films such as these were produced on both a limited budget and a limited time scale. Taking this into consideration, these films are little marvels for what they could achieve, and earn themselves a position in the annals of film history. Many famous actors made their first film appearances in these pictures, but now that many of them are lost to us forever, the recognition of the remaining few becomes a necessity."

References

Bibliography
 Chibnall, Steve. Quota Quickies: The Birth of the British 'B' Film. British Film Institute, 2007.
 Low, Rachael. Filmmaking in 1930s Britain. George Allen & Unwin, 1985.
 Wood, Linda. British Films, 1927-1939. British Film Institute, 1986.

External links
 

1933 films
British mystery films
1930s English-language films
Films directed by George Pearson
Films shot at Twickenham Film Studios
British black-and-white films
1933 mystery films
1930s British films
Quota quickies
RKO Pictures films